Cleo Fields (born November 22, 1962) is an American attorney and politician who represented  in the United States House of Representatives from 1993 to 1997 and ran unsuccessfully for governor of Louisiana in 1995. He serves as a state senator for Louisiana's 14th State Senate district, a position he held twice before.

Fields was born in Port Allen, Louisiana and received his undergraduate and law degrees from Southern University in Baton Rouge. In 1980, he founded the fundraising group Young Adults for Positive Action and in 1987 he was elected to the Louisiana Senate. He ran for Congress in 1990 and was defeated but was re-elected to the State Senate for the 14th district in 1991.

Fields was elected to represent Louisiana's 4th congressional district in the House of Representatives in 1992 and re-elected in 1994. He ran for governor in 1995, coming second in the jungle primary and then losing in a landslide to Mike Foster. He did not run for re-election to the House in 1996 and his seat was taken by Republican John Cooksey.

Fields was elected to the State Senate in 1997 and re-elected in 2003, then running unsuccessfully for the Louisiana Public Service Commission in 2004. On October 1, 2007, the Louisiana State Supreme Court ruled that Fields could not stand for re-election to his State Senate seat because of term limits. The state legislature had passed a law in 2006 that had defined the date of the swearing in of Fields and of the intended beneficiary, Shreveport Republican Wayne Waddell, in a way that would have allowed Fields and Waddell to stand for re-election in November 2007 and serve one more term, but the court ruled the law unconstitutional. He was elected to the seat again in 2019.

Early life and education
Fields was born in Port Allen, Louisiana, the seventh of ten children. His dock-worker father died when he was four, leaving his mother, Alice, to tend for the children herself. The family then moved to South Baton Rouge.

Fields attended Southern University, earning a Bachelor of Arts degree and Juris Doctor.

Career 
While still in law school, Fields began his first campaign for Louisiana State Senate, doing most of the organizational work himself and writing his own jingles for radio commercials. Fields began by building a base with college students in his campaign against longtime incumbent Richard Turnley. To the surprise of some experts, he unseated Turnley, who in the Commercial-Appeal referred to Fields as "a very ambitious young man and an astute campaigner."

U.S. House of Representatives

Fields served in the state Senate for six years. In 1990, he entered the nonpartisan blanket primary for the 8th District, but was defeated in the first round by incumbent Republican Clyde Holloway.

He ran again in 1992, this time in the newly-created 4th District, a 63 percent black majority district stretching in a "Z" shape from Shreveport to Baton Rouge. He finished first in a crowded seven-way primary, coming roughly 1,500 votes short of winning outright. He was forced into a runoff against fellow state senator Charles D. Jones of Monroe, which Fields won with more than 73 percent of the vote. At thirty, he was once again the youngest legislator. He advanced his agenda in Congress through the House Small Business Committee, the House Banking, Finance, and Urban Affairs Committee, the Housing and Community Opportunity Committee, and several others.

Fields was a staunch liberal while in Congress. He received a 0 percentage rating by the Christian Coalition and the Competitive Enterprise Institute. Meanwhile, progressive interest groups such as the National Abortion Rights Action League, PeacePAC, and the American Public Health Association, as well as a range of labor-affiliated organizations, gave him a perfect rating. His efforts as a legislator often involved channeling funds into education and protecting consumers from the excesses of insurers, banks, and other such institutions. Congressional Quarterly noted that Fields "has tried to use his seats on the Banking Committee and the Small Business Committee to leverage capital for small businesses willing to relocate in his district, where poverty rates are high." Though he made many political enemies with his voting record, his personal standing in Congress remained high. When his first child was born in 1995, he won cheers from his colleagues on the floor.

Fields' district was designed to collect a larger black populace — and more black votes — than a competing version. After various challenges, referrals to higher courts, and redraws, Fields was finally able to run in his custom-designed district and trounced a nominal Republican challenger in 1994. His district woes were far from over, however, and the district was ultimately thrown out by the Supreme Court as an unconstitutional racial gerrymander. His home in Baton Rouge was placed in the 6th District of Republican Richard Baker, while the northern portions were split between the 4th and 5th districts.

1995 Louisiana gubernatorial election 

In 1995 he became a candidate for Louisiana governor. Many in his party were angered by his candidacy, since most felt that a black challenger could not seriously win the office and Mason-Dixon Polling released on October 17, 1995 showed Fields to be the loser in every possible head-to-head combination of candidates. He narrowly beat the top two white Democratic candidates in the primary and made it to a runoff with Republican Mike Foster. Though race had been a preeminent factor during his Congressional redistricting fight, Fields vowed not to emphasize color in the election, proclaiming, "I'm not running to be the African American governor, but to be the best governor," in a speech excerpted in the Chicago Tribune. "Don't vote for me because I'm black, ... don't vote against me because I'm black." His remarks in the Los Angeles Times continued this theme: "When a baby cries, it's not a white baby or a black baby — it's a hungry baby," he asserted. "When people cry for job opportunities, they're not black or white — they're unemployed." He was also outspoken in his support for gun control, which Foster opposed.

Foster's conservative message, designed by media consultant Roy Fletcher, who also had handled Cleo Fields' campaign for Congress, resonated with Louisiana's voters, who in a previous election had given former Ku Klux Klan leader David Duke nearly 40 percent of the popular vote. As the polls predicted, Fields was defeated soundly in the runoff. Exit polling showed that 95% of his votes came from the black community. During this race Fields began a feud with fellow Democrat Mary Landrieu who did not endorse him in the second round. Like many, she believing his bid had been funded by Republicans and was intended to be a spoiler to let Foster win. Fields retaliated by labeling her campaign racist and refusing to endorse her in her later race for United States Senate. It was revealed that Fields had abused his Congressional franking privileges by sending newsletters to his district, at a cost of about $46,000, paid for by taxpayers, that were used for his gubernatorial bid.

Louisiana Senate
In 1997, Fields was again elected to the Louisiana Senate for the 14th district. He served at the same time as his brother Wilson until Wilson Fields won a judgeship, the first time in Louisiana history that two brothers served together in the Senate.

Fields served until he became ineligible to run for re-election because of term limits. An amendment to the term limits law was meant to have enabled him to run for another term, but the new law was invalidated by the Louisiana Supreme Court. He was succeeded in 2008 by Yvonne Dorsey-Colomb.

In 2019, Dorsey-Colomb was herself term-limited, and Fields ran to succeed her. On October 12, 2019, Fields was re-elected to the 14th senatorial district, making history again by becoming the first person in Louisiana to return to the Senate for the third time. He defeated State Representative Patricia Haynes Smith with 53% of the vote.

Personal life

"Rosa Parks sat...."

Fields is credited with the original version of a quotation that became popular following Barack Obama's victory in the 2008 presidential election. At the "State of the Black Union 2008" symposium in New Orleans, Louisiana in February 2008, Fields said, "Rosa Parks sat down so we could stand up. Martin Luther King marched so Jesse Jackson could run. Jesse Jackson ran so Obama could win." Another version has Fields saying, "W. E. B. Du Bois taught so that Rosa Parks could take a seat. Rosa took a seat so we all could take a stand. We all took a stand so that Martin Luther King Jr. could march. Martin marched so Jesse Jackson could run. Jesse ran so Obama could WIN." Fields's statement was shortened by the rapper Jay-Z in "My President Is Black": "Rosa Parks sat so Martin Luther could walk/ Martin Luther walked so Barack Obama could run/ Barack Obama ran so all the children could fly."

Elections 

Second Ballot, November 18, 1995

See also 
 List of African-American United States representatives

References

External links

|-

|-

|-

|-

|-

|-

1962 births
African-American members of the United States House of Representatives
African-American state legislators in Louisiana
Living people
Democratic Party members of the United States House of Representatives from Louisiana
Louisiana lawyers
Democratic Party Louisiana state senators
McKinley Senior High School alumni
People from Port Allen, Louisiana
Southern University alumni
Southern University Law Center alumni
21st-century American politicians
21st-century African-American politicians
20th-century African-American people